Lasaeidae is a family of very small saltwater clams, marine bivalve molluscs in the order Galeommatida. These bivalves are sometimes called "kelly clams", because one of the genera in this family is Kellia.

Genera and species
Genera and species within the family Lasaeidae include:
 Aligena I. Lea, 1843
 Aligena diegoana Hertlein and Grant, 1972
 Aligena elevata (Stimpson, 1851)
 Aligena texasiana Harry, 1969
 Arthritica Finlay, 1927
 Arthritica bifurca (Webster, 1908)
 Arthritica crassiformis Powell, 1933
 Arthritica hulmei Ponder, 1965
 Boreacola Bernard, 1979
 Boreacola dawsoni (Jeffreys, 1864)
 Boreacola vadosus Bernard, 1979
 Bornia Philippi, 1836
 Bornia longipes (Stimpson, 1855)
 Bornia sebetia Costa, 1829
 Borniola Iredale, 1924
 Borniola bidentifera (Powell, 1933)
 Borniola decapitata (Powell, 1939)
 Borniola neozelanica Powell, 1937
 Borniola powelli Crozier, 1966
 Borniola profunda (Dell, 1952)
 Borniola quadrata (Dell, 1956)
 Borniola reniformis (Suter, 1908)
 Borniola taieriensis (Powell, 1939)
 Borniopsis Habe, 1959
 Decipula Jeffreys, 1881
 Decipula tenella (Loven, 1846)
 Entovalva Voeltzkow, 1890
 Entovalva amboinensis  (Spärck, 1931)
 Entovalva lessonothuriae  Kato, 1999
 Entovalva mirabilis  Voeltzkow, 1890
 Entovalva nhatrangensis  Bristow, Berland, Schander & Vo, 2010
 Entovalva perrieri (Malard, 1903)  
 Erycina Lamarck, 1805
 Erycina balliana Dall, 1916
 Erycina coronata Dall, 1916
 Erycina emmonsi Dall, 1899
 Erycina linella Dall, 1899
 Erycina periscopiana Dall, 1899
 Isorobitella Keen, 1962
 Isorobitella trigonalis (Carpenter, 1857)
 Kellia Turton, 1822
 Kellia cycladea S. V. Wood, 1844
 Kellia cycladiformis Deshayes, 1834
 Kellia minima Ponder, 1971
 Kellia suborbicularis (Montagu, 1803)  
 Lasaea T. Brown, 1827
 Lasaea adansoni (Gmelin, 1791)
 Lasaea cistula Keen, 1938
 Lasaea maoria (Powell, 1933)
 Lasaea parengaensis Powell, 1935
 Lasaea rubra (Montagu, 1803)
 Lasaea rubra hinemoa Finlay, 1928
 Lasaea rubra rossiana Finlay, 1928
 Lasaea subviridis Dall, 1899
 Lepton Turton, 1822
 Lepton lacerum (Jeffreys, 1872)
 Lepton lepidum Say, 1826
 Lepton meroeum Carpenter, 1864
 Lepton nitidum
 Lepton squamosum (Montagu, 1803)
 Mancikellia Dall, 1899
 Mancikellia pumila (S. V. Wood, 1850)
 Melliteryx Iredale, 1924
 Melliteryx parva Deshayes, 1856
 Montacuta Turton, 1822
 Montacuta dawsoni Jeffreys, 1864
 Montacuta donacina (S. V. Wood, 1802)
 Montacuta elevata
 Montacuta ferruginosa
 Montacuta limpida Dall, 1899
 Montacuta minuscula Dall, 1899
 Montacuta percompressa Dall, 1899
 Montacuta planata
 Montacuta semiradiata neozelanica (Dell, 1956)
 Montacuta substriata (Montagu, 1808)
 Montacuta voringi Friele, 1877
 Myllita d'Orbigny and Récluz, 1850
 Myllita stowei (Hutton, 1873)
 Myllitella Finlay, 1927
 Myllitella vivens vivens Finlay, 1927
 Myllitella vivens pinguis Marwick, 1928
 Mysella Angas, 1877
 Mysella aleutica Dall, 1899
 Mysella alpha Powell, 1937
 Mysella aupouria Powell, 1937
 Mysella beringensis (Dall, 1916)
 Mysella beta Powell, 1937
 Mysella bidentata
 Mysella casta (A. E. Verrill and Bush, 1898)
 Mysella charcoti (Lamy, 1906)
 Mysella compressa (Dall, 1913)
 Mysella dawsoni (Jeffreys, 1864)
 Mysella golischi (Dall, 1916)
 Mysella grebnitzkii (Dall, 1916)
 Mysella grippi (Dall, 1912)
 Mysella henryi Fleming, 1948
 Mysella hounselli Powell, 1931
 Mysella lachlani Dell, 1952
 Mysella larochei Powell, 1940
 Mysella macquariensis (Hedley, 1916)
 Mysella moelleri (Mörch, 1875)
 Mysella morioria Dell, 1952
 Mysella ovata (Jeffreys, 1881)
 Mysella pedroana Dall, 1899
 Mysella planata (Krause, 1885)
 Mysella planulata (Stimpson, 1851)
 Mysella sovialiki
 Mysella striatula A. E. Verrill and Bush, 1898
 Mysella tellinula (Odhner, 1924)
 Mysella triquetra (A. E. Verrill and Bush, 1898)
 Mysella tumida (Carpenter, 1864)
 Mysella tumidula (Jeffreys, 1866)
 Mysella unidentata (Odhner, 1924)
 Neaeromya Gabe, 1873
 Neaeromya chacei (Dall, 1916)
 Neaeromya compressa (Dall, 1899)
 Neaeromya floridana (Dall, 1899)
 Neaeromya myaciformis (Dall, 1916)
 Neaeromya rugifera (Carpenter, 1864)
 Neaeromya stearnsi (Dall, 1899)
 Odontogena Cowan, 1964
 Odontogena borealis Cowan, 1964
 Orobitella Dall, 1900
 Orobitella bakeri (Dall, 1916)
 Orobitella californica (Dall, 1899)
 Orobitella floridana (Dall, 1899)
 Orobitella limpida (Dall, 1899)
 Parabornia Boss, 1965
 Parabornia squillina Boss, 1965 
 Planktomya Simroth, 1896
 Planktomya henseni Simroth, 1896
 Platomysia Habe, 1951
 Platomysia rugata Habe, 1951
 Pristes Carpenter, 1864
Pristes oblongus Carpenter, 1864 – chiton clam
 Pseudopythina P. Fischer, 1884
 Pythinella Dall, 1899
 Pythinella cuneata (A. E. Verrill and Bush, 1898)  
 Rhamphidonta Bernard, 1975
Rhamphidonta retifera (Dall, 1899) – netted kellyclam
 Rochefortia Velain, 1878
 Rochefortia compressa Dall, 1913
 Rochefortia grippi Dall, 1912
 Rochefortia tumida (Carpenter, 1864)
 Semierycina Monterosato, 1911
 Semierycina nitida (Turton, 1822)
 Semierycina tenera (Jeffreys, 1881)
 Tellimya Brown, 1827
 Tellimya ferruginosa (Montagu, 1803)
 Tellimya phascolionis (Dautzenberg and Fischer, 1925)  
 Tellimya vitrea aupouria Ponder, 1968
 Tomburchus W. H. Harry, 1969  
 Tomburchus redondoensis (Burch, 1941)

References

 Powell A. W. B., New Zealand Mollusca, William Collins Publishers Ltd, Auckland, New Zealand 1979 
  J. Lützen, B. Berland & G.A.Bristow, Morphology of an endosymbiotic bivalve, Entovalva nhatrangensis (Bristow, Berland, Schander & Vo, 2010) (Galeommatoidea); Molluscan Research 31(2): 114–124 ; ISSN 1323-5818
  

 
Taxa named by John Edward Gray
Bivalve families